The  is the military reserve force of the Malaysian Army.

The Regiment infantry units formerly consisted of 2 series of reservists; the mobilised 300 series and the volunteer 500 series. The 300 series, which consisted of 5 infantry battalions, with mobilised reservists for full-time duty, have since 2008 been converted into a new regular border regiment, the Rejimen Sempadan. The 500 series are reserve volunteers units, based in major towns and cities throughout the whole country. In all, there are about sixteen 500 series infantry battalions, in addition to other support and service support reserve units.

History
 Pioneer Units in Malaya

In 1861, the Penang Pioneers were formed as a volunteer army unit of the Straits Settlement. Similar units were created in Singapore and in the other Malay States.

In 1902, the Malay States formed the Malay States Volunteer Rifles (MSVR). The Unfederated Malay States also formed their own volunteer units. With further expansion, the formations were then known as the Federated Malay States Volunteer Force (FMSVF), Unfederated Malay States Volunteer Force (UFMSVF) and the Straits Settlement Volunteer Force (SSVF).
 Second World War
With the outbreak of the Second World War, the volunteer units were mobilised and fought alongside the regular British, Indian, and Australian troops in the defence of Malaya and Fortress Singapore.
 Japanese Occupation of Malaya
During the Japanese Occupation of Malaya, the Chinese dominated Malayan People's Anti-Japanese Army conducted guerrilla warfare against the Japanese occupiers. As only the regular Malay Regiment led by British officers had acquitted itself well until the surrender in Singapore (February 1942), the British felt it was possible to involve Malays in the resistance against the Japanese but only with extensive training and by working in close cooperation with the stay-behind British forces. The British desperately needed Malay resistance fighters to operate in Malay-dominated areas. During the Japanese Occupation, a number of local Malays formed resistance groups and carried out guerrilla warfare against the Japanese. Resistance units in Pahang were called WATANIAH, derived from the Arabic word WATAN (state). The Wataniah was led by Yeop Mahidin Bin Mohamed Shafiff (known as the Father of Wataniah). Force 136 of the Special Operations Executive was amongst the British formations that coordinated the Malayan resistance (including the Wataniah movement) against the Japanese.
 Malayan Emergency
After the war, the volunteer units were reformed. With the start of the Malayan Emergency, the Home Guard was raised and tasked with local static defence, thus releasing regular British, Commonwealth, and Malayan units for combat operations against the Communist Terrorists. In 1958, with the security situation under control and the threat from the Communist Terrorists diminished, the Home Guard was disbanded.

However, many of the members of the Home Guard wished to continue their voluntary service, and the Federation Government agreed to the formation of the Territorial Army of Malaya, the Rejimen Askar Wataniah, with the passing of the Territorial Army Ordinance 1958. On 1 June 1958, the TA Ordinance took effect, officially marking the beginning of the TA of Malaysia and thus is marked as the Regimental Day of the Askar Wataniah. The first-generation Territorials were made up of mostly personnel of the Home Guard.

 Al-Mau'nah Arms Heist, 2000
The Al-Mau'nah Sauk Arms Heist happened on 2 July 2000 at an outpost and a camp manned by members of Bn 3524 of Rejimen Askar Wataniah was involved in an arms heist by the Al-Mau'nah Militant Group. In the small hours of the morning, 21 members of the militant group visited the outpost and camp of Bn 304 Rejimen Askar Wataniah under the guise of a surprise inspection and relieved the soldiers' weapons or carted away weapons from the armoury. They took away a huge cache of firearms and ammunition, including 97 M16 assault rifles, four GPMGs, five grenade launchers, 9,095 rounds of 5.56mm and 60 rounds of 40mm ammunition. The group was later cornered in the village of Sauk, Perak, and involved in a stand-off the Malaysian Army and Royal Malaysian Police forces. Police threw a containment cordon of Bukit Jenalik. The group then took several hostages and holed up for four days in Bukit Jenalik, Sauk before finally surrendering to security forces. However, they brutally tortured and murdered two of the hostages -— a soldier and a police officer.

The Al-Mau'nah group later surrendered, and the leaders were brought to trial for "waging war upon the King". Mohamed Amin Mohamed Razali and his group were brought to trial for charges of "waging war against the King", and became the first people convicted of such charges in Malaysia. Mohamed Amin Mohamed Razali and his two lieutenants, Zahit Muslim and Jamaluddin Darus, were sentenced to death. Sixteen others were given life sentences.

Combat element

The 500 series is tasked with the same mission as the combat infantry battalions of the Royal Malay Regiment and the Royal Ranger Regiment. There are currently 16 Wataniah Regiments, organized into a regimental HQ and (nominal) infantry battalions.

The national organization of these reserve regiments are as follows:
 Rejimen 501 Askar Wataniah HQ, Kem Tebrau, Johor Bahru, Johor
 Batalion 1, Kem Tebrau, Johor Bahru
 Kompeni A, Kem Tebrau, Johor Bahru
 Kompeni B, Kem Kota Tinggi
 Kompeni C, Kem Pontian
 Batalion 2, Kem Muar
 Kompeni A, Kem Muar
 Kompeni B, Kem Tangkak
 Kompeni C, Kem Segamat
 Batalion 3, Kem Kluang
 Kompeni A, Kem Kluang
 Kompeni B, Kem Batu Pahat
 Kompeni C, Kem Sri Pantai, Mersing
 Rejimen 502 Askar Wataniah HQ, Kem Sungai Buloh, Selangor
 Batalion 1, Kem Sungai Buloh
 Batalion 2, Kem Shah Alam
 Batalion 3, Kem Sabak Bernam
 Pusat Latihan Rejimen 502 Askar Wataniah, Kem Sungai Tenggi
 Rejimen 503 Askar Wataniah HQ, Kem Jalan Tambun, Ipoh, Perak
 Batalion 1, Kem Jalan Tambun, Ipoh
 Kompeni A, Kem Jalan Tambun, Ipoh
 Kompeni B, Kem Parit
 Kompeni C, Kem Sitiawan
 Kompeni D, Kem Politeknik Ungku Omar, Ipoh
 Batalion 2, Kem Jalan Temenggong, Taiping
 Kompeni A, Kem Jalan Temenggong, Taiping
 Kompeni B, Kem Kuala Kangsar
 Kompeni C, Kem Gerik
 Kompeni D, Kem Pengkalan Hulu
 Batalion 3, Kem Teluk Intan
 Kompeni A, Kem Tapah
 Kompeni B, Kem Teluk Intan
 Kompeni C, Kem Kolej Tuanku Abdul Rahman (Kampar)
 Kompeni D, Kem Politeknik Sultan Azlan Shah (Behrang)
 Pusat Latihan Rejimen 503 Askar Wataniah, Kem Jalan Tambun, Ipoh
 Rejimen 504 Askar Wataniah HQ, Kem Bukit Keteri, Kangar, Perlis
 Rejimen 505 Askar Wataniah HQ, Kem Force 136, Sungai Miang, Pahang
 Batalion 1, Kem Teluk Sisik / Kem Forever 1st, Kuantan, Pahang
 Batalion 2, Kem Susur Tembeling, Jerantut
 Batalion 3, Kem Puncak Mas, Raub
 Kompeni A, Kem Bentong
 Batalion 4, Kem Force 136, Sungai Miang, Pekan
 Rejimen 506 Askar Wataniah HQ, Kem Pengkalan Chepa, Kota Bahru, Kelantan
 Batalion 1, Kem Pengkalan Chepa, Kota Bahru
 Batalion 2, Kem Machang
 Batalion 3, Kem Sungai Durian, Kuala Krai
 Pusat Latihan Rejimen 506 Askar Wataniah, Kem Sungai Durian, Kuala Krai
 Rejimen 507 Askar Wataniah, Kem Bukit Perwira, Kota Kinabalu, Sabah
 Rejimen 508 Askar Wataniah HQ, Kem Jalan Rasah, Seremban, Negeri Sembilan
 Batalion 1, Kem Sikamat, Seremban
 Batalion 2, Kem Tampin
 Batalion 3, Kem Kuala Pilah
 Rejimen 509 Askar Wataniah HQ, Kem Lebuhraya Peel, George Town, Pulau Pinang
 Rejimen 510 Askar Wataniah, Kem Sri Rejang, Sibu, Sarawak
 Rejimen 511 Askar Wataniah, Kem Ria Kompleks, Kuching, Sarawak
 Rejimen 512 Askar Wataniah, Kem Padang Midin, Kuala Berang, Terengganu
 Rejimen 513 Askar Wataniah HQ, Kem Jalan Kolam Air, Sungai Petani, Kedah
 Batalion 1, Kem Jalan Kolam Air, Sungai Petani
 Batalion 2, Kem Kulim
 Batalion 3, Kem Bukit Pinang, Kepala Batas
 Rejimen 514 Askar Wataniah HQ, Kem Bukit Beruang, Melaka
 Batalion 1, Melaka Tengah, Kem Bukit Beruang
 Batalion 2, Alor Gajah, Kem Bukit Beruang
 Batalion 3, Jasin, Kem Bukit Beruang
 Rejimen 515 Askar Wataniah, Kem Kementah, Kuala Lumpur
 Rejimen 516 Askar Wataniah, Kem Kukusan, Tawau, Sabah

The 515 Infantry Regiment Askar Wataniah, assigned to and with garrison near the Ministry of Defence Headquarters, serves as the combat and ceremonial reserve of both the 1st Battalions of the RMR and RRR, and thus is equivalent to the London Guards of the British Army.

The other regiments of TA infantry formations are the Malaysian equivalent to both the former regional British Army infantry regiments and the infantry components of the Army Reserve.

Combat support element

The Wataniah Armoured Squadrons are the integrated components of the regular units of the Royal Armoured Corps. The Squadrons are currently located at Port Dickson, Kuantan, Sungai Petani and Kota Belud. Organized as an administrative battalion, they are formed in a similar manner to British yeomanry units.

The Wataniah Artillery Batteries are integrated components of the regular units of the Royal Artillery Regiment. The Wataniah Artillery Batteries are located in Kota Bharu, Taiping, Melaka, Seremban and Kuala Lumpur. They too are organized into a battalion of field artillery with batteries integrated into divisional artillery.

The Wataniah Signal Squadrons assist regular squadrons of the Royal Signals Regiment in establishing and maintaining Army communications. Squadrons are located in Kuala Lumpur, Ipoh and Sungei Besi.

The Wataniah Engineer Squadrons provide combat engineering skills alongside regular engineer squadrons. Squadrons are located in Kuala Terengganu, Kajang, Klang and Penang and are affiliated with the Royal Engineers Regiment.

The Wataniah Military Police Companies, affiliated with the Royal Military Police Corps, are tasked with helping the discipline and law enforcement, based in Penang, Kuantan, Sg. Buloh and Kem Genting.

The Wataniah Intelligence unit is an integral part of the regular battalion of the Kor Risik diRaja (Royal Intelligence Corps) and is located in Penang.

The Askar Wataniah Electrical and Mechanical Engineers maintain two workshops, one in Ipoh and the other in Kuala Lumpur as well as 4 field workshops based in Taiping, Melaka, Kuantan, and Kuching. They help the Royal Electrical and Mechanical Engineers Corps in vehicular, mechanical, and electrical maintenance and engineering duties as well as in the maintenance of the TA's own vehicles and electrical and mechanical assets.

Services support element
The Wataniah Logistic Corps consists of 5 transport companies based in Seremban, Kuala Lumpur, Johor Bahru and Kota Bharu, one supply company based in Kuala Lumpur, and one air despatch platoon based in Taiping.

The Wataniah Ordnan Corps maintains a single Kumpulan Ordnan Briged (Brigade Ordnance Group) based in Kuala Lumpur while Wataniah Brigade Ordnance groups are integrated into regular Army brigades in Kuching, Taiping, Melaka, and Kuantan.

Askar Wataniah also has 4 medical companies (called Kompeni Ubat AW) based in Kuantan, Kluang, Sungai Petani and Kuching.

Specialist Elements

The Askar Wataniah Specialist Signals Unit specialises in the maintenance of communication, and its members are drawn from amongst the staff of Telekom Malaysia Berhad.

Askar Wataniah Specialist Engineering Units are based at the Markas Jurutera (SP) (HQ L of C) in Bukit Haigate, Kuala Lumpur and comprises:
 Port Specialist Regiment (Jurutera Pakar Pelabuhan) These port operating units are formed at the main Malaysian ports, and members are drawn from amongst port personnel at the ports of Kuantan, Klang, Penang, Bintulu and Kuching.
 Railway Specialist Regiment is tasked with the maintenance and operation of the Malaysian railway system during emergencies. The unit recruits from members of Malayan Railways and the State Railway of Sabah.
 Water Specialist Regiment with strength recruited from the staff of water supply utility companies.
 Power Specialist Regiment are recruited from Tenaga Nasional Berhad and other power generation companies.

Pasukan Latihan Pegawai Simpanan (PALAPES)
Pasukan Latihan Pegawai Simpanan (PALAPES) or Reserve Officers Training Units (ROTU) were formed at 13 universities and institutions of higher learning all over Malaysia. Its main purpose is to train (diploma and first degree) students to become subalterns or young officers to serve as active reservists in the TA 500 series upon their commission.  These students will be known as 'cadet officers' and undergo training for the next three (3) years to qualify them for King's Commission. It was said that the cadet's training is the equivalent standard of the 1 year RMC Cadet Wings training. After commissioning as a second lieutenant, they are transferred to any 16 TA 500 series to serve as reservists. Many of them join the Malaysian Army as a regular officers under the Graduate Scheme.

It had been perceived that the establishment of PALAPES was highly motivated by the American's own ROTC or Reserve Officer Training Corps and UK's own OTC or Officer Training Corps.  The ROTC or OTC standards were and are still highly regarded as equivalent to their counterpart at Westpoint or Sandhurst, unlike in Malaysia, the PALAPES standard is yet to be officially recognised as equivalent to the current institutions such Cadet Wings RMC, Airforce College, Naval College, ATMA and now UPNM.  Standardisation is important to ensure the country's combat readiness is not compromised.

Historically, following the Confrontation, the Reserve unit was formed on 3 April 1965 as the 1st Infantry Battalion, Askar Wataniah at University Malaya, mustered from amongst undergraduates and staff of Universiti Malaya. Initially, 30 undergraduates from various faculties volunteered and underwent basic training during their semester breaks at the Recruit Training Camp at Kem Latihan Seputih, Batu Gajah, Perak. The majority of the recruits had prior experience in the Army and Police Cadets and many were former students of the Maktab Tentera DiRaja (Royal Military College).

The aftermath of 13 May 1969 riots saw the expansion of the Askar Wataniah unit to other universities with A Company formed in Institut Teknologi MARA, B Company formed in Universiti Pertanian Malaysian (UPM) (now called Universiti Putra Malaysia) and C Company formed at Universiti Kebangsaan Malaysia while the unit at Universiti Malaya took on the role of battalion HQ.

On 18 December 1978, the Brigadier General Dato' Abdul As Ismail, the Director of Askar Wataniah discussed the formation of the Reserve Officers Training Units with the university Vice-Chancellors and the Director of ITM. Pursuant to the meeting, the Armed Forces Council approved the formation of the Reserve Officer Training Unit ROTU at Malaysian local universities to attract Reserve Officers from amongst staff and undergraduates of the various universities. ROTU is currently known as Pasukan Latihan Pegawai Simpanan (PALAPES).

There are currently thirteen (13) Malaysian public universities and institutions of higher education (IPTAs) hosting PALAPES units. Units are formed at Universiti Malaya (PALAPES UM), Universiti Teknologi Malaysia, Universiti Kebangsaan Malaysia, Universiti Sains Malaysia, Universiti Putra Malaysia, Universiti Utara Malaysia, Universiti Malaysia Sarawak, Universiti Malaysia Sabah, Universiti Teknologi MARA, Universiti Tun Hussein Onn Malaysia, Universiti Pendidikan Sultan Idris, Universiti Malaysia Perlis, Universiti Malaysia Terengganu, International Islamic University Malaysia and Universiti Malaysia Pahang. There are several universities hosting tri-services PALAPES units e.g. Army, Navy, and Airforce, some hosting Army and Navy and most hosting only the Army.

Now, with thirteen (13) universities and IPTAs hosting PALAPES units, around 1,200 up to 3,000 officers or subalterns or commonly known as YO (young officers) are commissioned yearly.  The mass commissioning of the new YO yearly had indirectly created some issues to the Armed Forces such as;

a) Imbalance number of positions available in the TA units compared to the growing number of YOs

b) Imbalance of strength between NCOs and YOs

c) Many of the YOs are posted to infantry units of 500 series rather than to fill many available subalterns post at combat support elements and services such as Medic Corp, Signal, etc.

d) The recruitment of Potential Officers (PO) to post directly as Capt, Major, or Lt Col within one week of training had created a gap between the inexperienced and troublesome YOs in terms of quality of delivery as platoon commander up until battalion command.

Mobilised units
The mobilised units before disbanded consisted of five 300 series infantry battalions of the Rejimen Askar Wataniah responsible for protecting the northern border of peninsular Malaysia, the security of East-West Highway, and Key Points Units tasked in protecting the strategic areas of the country. These units have since been converted into Rejimen Sempadan, or Border Regiment literally, on 9 February 2008.

Valour
Although the unit is a reserve force, the unit has produced a soldier awarded the medal of honour. One Private Ielias Ibrahim was awarded the medal Panglima Gagah Berani (PGB) for his action in a firefight at Grik, Perak on 15 August 1977.

Notable members
 Khairy Jamaluddin, former Minister Youth and Sport and commander of Rejimen 508 Askar Wataniah
 Ielias Ibrahim The only Regiment Member who received a Star of the Commander of Valour medal

See also
 Australian Army Reserve
 British Army Reserve
 United States Army Reserve

References

External links
 Overview of Askar Wataniah, Malaysian Army Official Website
 a history of Askar Wataniah (in Bahasa Melayu) 
 A biography of KOLONEL DATO' YEOP MAHIDIN BIN MOHAMED SHAFIFF, the father of Askar Wataniah (in Bahasa Melayu) 
 An overview of the 500 series Regiment (in Bahasa Melayu) 
 303 INFANTRY BATTALION Askar Wataniah by DR CHEN WEI SENG 
 Pasukan Latihan Pegawai Simpanan (PALAPES) Universiti Malaya
 Malaysian Army Web page – Laman Web Tentera Darat Malaysia
 Portal PALAPES – PASUKAN LATIHAN PEGAWAI SIMPANAN
 12 Kompeni Ubat (AW)
 The Japanese Occupation of Malaya: A Socio-Economic History, by Paul H. Kratoska pg 294
 Rejimen Askar Wataniah Website at Malaysian Multimedia University

Malaysia Army corps and regiments
Reserve forces of Malaysia
Military units and formations established in 1958
Military units and formations of British Malaya in World War II
1958 establishments in Malaya